Leonard Taylor is an American professional soccer coach who coached the Saint Kitts and Nevis national football team from January to February 2008.

References

External links
Profile at Soccerway.com

Year of birth missing (living people)
Living people
American soccer coaches
Expatriate football managers in Saint Kitts and Nevis
Saint Kitts and Nevis national football team managers
Place of birth missing (living people)